Galerie Cesty ke světlu is a modern art gallery in Prague. It was founded by the Czech painter and psychologist Zdeněk Hajný in 1994. It covers the work of the artist and includes Cristal caffetery used for spiritual lectures.

References

External links 
  

Art museums and galleries in the Czech Republic
Art galleries established in 1994
1994 establishments in the Czech Republic
20th-century architecture in the Czech Republic